, born 18 November 1985) is a Japanese retired weightlifter. In the 48kg category, she won the silver medal at the 2012 Olympics and won bronze at the 2016 Olympics. Her father and coach is Yoshiyuki Miyake, who was a bronze medallist in weightlifting at the 1968 Mexico City Olympics. Her uncle Yoshinobu Miyake was a gold medalist in weightlifting at the 1964 and 1968 Olympics.

She is an employee of Inc., a Japanese sustainable infrastructure company.

Career
At the 2004 Summer Olympics she ranked 9th in the 48 kg category.

Miyake participated in the women's -48 kg class at the 2006 World Weightlifting Championships and won the bronze medal, finishing behind Yang Lian and Wiratthaworn Aree. She snatched 80 kg and clean and jerked an additional 108 kg for a total of 188 kg, 29 kg behind winner Qiu, but as much as second placed Aree, who because of her lighter weight was ranked in a better position.

At the 2008 Summer Olympics she ranked 6th in the 48 kg category.

In July 2012, Miyake won the silver medal at the 2012 Summer Olympics in the 48 kg category.

In August 2016, Miyake was back on the podium at the 2016 Summer Olympics by winning the Bronze medal in the 48 kg category.

At the 2020 Summer Olympics in Tokyo, Japan, she did not successfully complete the clean and jerk in the women's 49 kg event and she did not place.

References

External links

 at beijing2008
Inc.

Living people
1985 births
Japanese female weightlifters
Olympic weightlifters of Japan
Weightlifters at the 2004 Summer Olympics
Weightlifters at the 2008 Summer Olympics
Weightlifters at the 2012 Summer Olympics
Weightlifters at the 2016 Summer Olympics
Weightlifters at the 2020 Summer Olympics
Medalists at the 2012 Summer Olympics
Medalists at the 2016 Summer Olympics
Olympic medalists in weightlifting
Olympic silver medalists for Japan
Olympic bronze medalists for Japan
World Weightlifting Championships medalists
Asian Games competitors for Japan
Weightlifters at the 2006 Asian Games
Weightlifters at the 2010 Asian Games
Weightlifters at the 2014 Asian Games
Place of birth missing (living people)
20th-century Japanese women
21st-century Japanese women